Victoria Konefal is an American actress. She has portrayed Ciara Brady on the NBC soap opera Days of Our Lives since 2017.

Early life
Konefal was born in Brooklyn, New York. Her family consists of her parents, an older brother and sister. She studied at Fiorello H. LaGuardia High School. In 2015, she participated in a beauty pageant competition, where she was crowned Miss Poland USA.

Career
Konefal is signed with MN2S International Music & Talent Agency and Katz PR, previously she was signed with Talent Works and Bold Management & Production. Konefal started her acting career in 2015 by landing a lead role in two films Forgetting Sandy Glass as Kelly, and the horror film Fog City as Georgia Paige. In 2016, she guest-starred in an episode of Modern Family as Rivka. In 2017, she appeared in three films: The Wrong Crush, where she played the lead role of Amelia; horror film Circus Kane as Tracy; and Deadly Exchange as Blake. In August 2017, it was announced that she had been cast in the role of Ciara Brady on the NBC soap opera, Days of Our Lives. She debuted on December 1, 2017.

Filmography

Awards and nominations

References

External links
 

Actresses from San Francisco
American film actresses
American soap opera actresses
American television actresses
Living people
Daytime Emmy Award winners
Daytime Emmy Award for Outstanding Younger Performer in a Drama Series winners
21st-century American women
People from Brooklyn
Fiorello H. LaGuardia High School alumni
Year of birth missing (living people)